Chatsworth Charter High School is a charter secondary school located in Chatsworth in the San Fernando Valley of Los Angeles, California, U.S.

History 
The campus was built with one-story buildings around a central quad as land was inexpensive and an open, outdoor feeling was consistent with the area. The administration building anchors the southeast end of the quad, while the cafeteria and auditorium anchors the northwest end. Athletics are on the other side of the internal roadway.

Activities
Chatsworth's Chancellor band was the last LAUSD band to go to the Pasadena Tournament of Roses Parade, January 1, 1969, as the system of selecting a school's band was changed to selecting players from each band. The band was led by music teacher Irwin Pope and co-drum majors Eric Micko and Loring Kutchins. Although the Chatsworth band itself couldn't march as a whole through the Pasadena Tournament of Roses parade, the band still promoted its members through the Los Angeles Unified School District All District High school honor band. More recently, multiple students from the Chatsworth Chancellor band have auditioned and made it in the Los Angeles Unified School District All District High School honor band. 

Chatsworth's Drama Department participates in Fall and Shakespeare DTASC Festivals every year, earning recognition in acting and technical design. The department puts on a production every year and is Thespian Troupe #2314 in the National Honor Thespian Society. Many notable artists are alumni of Chatsworth High School's Drama Department, including Val Kilmer, Mare Winningham and Kevin Spacey. Spacey co-produced the 2011 documentary Shakspeare High, which features Chatsworth's Drama Department.

The film program participates in multiple youth film festivals, some including but not limited to, Mitchell Englander's Making Movies that Matter Festival, CSPAN's Student Cam annual national video documentary competition, and Directing Change's  festival. In 2020, three students from the Chatsworth film Program won an honorable mention award in the Directing Change's Festival under the Suicide Prevention Category.  The program was run by David Massey, an academy award-nominated filmmaker, from 1994-2019, retiring in his 25th year as a teacher.

Athletics 
Between 1989-1993 the Women's Soccer team were undefeated winning CIF Championships each year. 
In 2003 and 2004, the Chatsworth High School baseball team was ranked first in the Baseball America/National High School Baseball Coaches Association Top 50 poll. In 2007, Chatsworth High players Matt Dominguez (baseball) and Mike Moustakas were selected in the first round of the 2007 Major League Baseball Draft. Chatsworth High is one of only seven schools to have produced two first round draft picks in the same year. Other notable players to have played at Chatsworth High School include: Josh Ravin, Dwight Evans, Bobby Mitchell, Andre David, and Bryan Petersen.  Evans is the namesake of Chatsworth's football stadium.

Wrestling were CIF Champions in 1974 under Coach Bob Hammond. 2004 brought another CIF Championship under Coach Richard Carrillo. With only 10 wrestlers entered in the tournament, a school record 6 wrestlers were in the finals all of whom won individual titles and contributed to the overall team championship: Jonathan Lawes, Jonathan Vargas, Robert Johnson, Paul Medina, Edwin Martinez, and Oscar Garcia.

The men's soccer team were state champions in 1991, defeating Bell High School 1-0.

The women's basketball team were CIF Division 1 City Champions in 2009, defeating Taft Charter High School 
Chatsworth High School's wrestling team has won the Los Angeles City Section CIF Title in 1974 and 2004.
Chatsworth High School's Varsity Football team won the Los Angeles City 3AAA Championship in 1979.  The team was undefeated and untied for 12 games defeating rival Canoga Park High School.

In 1968, Chatsworth High School gymnast Steven Hug represented USA in the Olympics. He became the youngest US male Olympian in history.

In 2009, the Track and Field Organization decided to create a new award named after an athlete "Nolan Blake" who brought incredible inspirational and motivation to the program that will live on forever. Prior to this, it was called the "Most Inspirational Award", but starting in 2009 it was renamed to the "Nolan Blake Award" to honor his accomplishments and the award is still being given out under the new name as of today. This would also go down in history as being the first ever award named after someone who attended Chatsworth High School.

Most recently the school's softball team won their first ever LA-CIF championship in May 2015 versus Carson High School. Coach John Forgerson, named Daily News coach of the year, guided the star-studded team in his first year at the school. Four of the seniors signed letters of intent with Division 1 schools across the nation and anchored the infield. It was the first championship for the Chatsworth since the 2009 baseball team won the CIF-LA title.

Notable alumni 

Farah Alvin, broadway performer
Rich Aude, baseball player 
Howard S. Berger, filmmaker
Larry Beinfest, baseball executive
Jim Benedict, baseball executive
Gennifer Brandon, basketball player
Alex Borstein, actress
Kirk Cameron, actor
Matt Cassel, football player
Christie Claridge, actress and model
Andre David, baseball player 
Lori Beth Denberg, actress
Matt Dominguez , baseball player
Scott English, basketball player
Christine Essel, film executive 
Dwight Evans, baseball player
Greg Glassman, founder of CrossFit
Brian Grazer, film executive
Steve Hug, gymnast 
Val Kilmer, actor
Stepfanie Kramer, actress 
Rory Markas, sports broadcaster 
Oscar Marin, baseball coach
Mike Moustakas, baseball player
Bryan Petersen, baseball player
Rhonda Jo Petty, actress
Bradley Pierce, actor*Josh Ravin, baseball player
Steve Reed, baseball player
Adam Rich, actor 
Lindsay Sloane, actress
Kevin Spacey, actor
Deshawn Stephens, basketball player
Ty Van Burkleo, baseball player
Mare Winningham, actress
Donna Lee Wennerstrom, 1976 Summer Olympic Finalist 400m IM
Arianne Zucker, actress and model

References

External links  

Chatsworth High School website

Educational institutions established in 1963
High schools in Los Angeles County, California
Los Angeles Unified School District schools
High schools in the San Fernando Valley
Public high schools in California
Chatsworth, Los Angeles
1963 establishments in California